SDK or sdk may refer to:
 Software development kit
 Samahang Demokratiko ng Kabataan, a Filipino mass youth organization
 Sandakan Airport (IATA code SDK), Malaysia
 Serbian Volunteer Corps (World War II), (Srpski Dobrovoljački Korpus), Axis group
 Slovak Democratic Coalition (Slovenská demokratická koalícia), 1998–2002
 Social Democrats (Kyrgyzstan), a political party
 Sos Kundi language (ISO 639-3 code sdk), a language spoken in Papua New Guinea
 Showa Denko (Shōwa Denkō Kabushiki-gaisha), a Japanese chemical company